The Stanley Hugh Badock Professorship of Music was established in 1946 at the University of Bristol, and named after Sir Stanley Badock (died 1945), who had been Pro-Chancellor of the University.

List of Stanley Hugh Badock Professors 
 1947–1958: Walter Kendall Stanton.
 1958–1972: Willis Grant.
 1972–1994: Raymond Henry Charles Warren.
 1994–2002: Thomas James "Jim" Samson.
 2003–2012: Stephen David Banfield.
 2013–2017: Katharine Ellis.
 2017–present: Sarah Hibberd.

References 

University of Bristol